English words